Pietro Ferrari may refer to:

 Pietro Ferrari (footballer born 1906), Italian footballer who played for Roma and Casale in the Serie A
 Pietro Ferrari (footballer born 1914), Italian footballer who played for Bologna in the Serie A and Italy national team
 Pietro Melchiorre Ferrari (1735–1787), painter from Parma

See also
 Pietro Ferraris (1912–1991), Italian footballer